Sheikh Abdulkarim Zanjani (1888 - 1968) was born in modern-day Iran, in the city of Zanjan, in the village of BarroBarrout. He went to Tehran to study, and became concerned with politics relating to Islamic nations. At 22 years old, he went to Najaf, and became a pupil of well-known renowned religious scholars, such as Seyyed Mohammad Kazem Yazdi and Seyyed Mohammad Firouz Abadi. He demonstrated insight and skills in the sphere of Islamic philosophy. He is recognized primarily for two accomplishments,one concerned with the reconciliation and nearness of sects and Islamic cults, and later with the development of Islamic philosophy.  

His works encompassed subjects such as Avicenna, Al-Kindi, the development of philosophy, and various discussions of jurisprudence.

Education 
Karim received his early education at Immaculate Seminary Qazvin. He moved to Najaf for his higher education.

His professors in Najaf were:

 Mohammed Kazem Yazdi
 Fethullah Qa'ravi Isfahani
 Akhund Khorasani
 Muhammad Hujjat Kuh-Kamari
 Mirza Mohammad Taqi Shirazi

Return to Zanjan 
Karim returned to Zanjan in 1908 to promote religion, the affairs of the Muslim people, and to train seminary students. Mirza Baqir Zanjani taught alongside prominent teachers such as Sayed Ahmad Zanjani, a leading scholar in Qom during the Boroujerdi time. He died at the age of 84.

References

External links

 Islamic Philosophy 
 Bustane Ketab 

1887 births
1968 deaths
Iranian Shia scholars of Islam
Burials at Imam Ali Mosque